Sven Johanson (November 25, 1924 – September 11, 1976) was an American cross-country skier. He competed in the men's 30 kilometre event at the 1960 Winter Olympics.

References

1924 births
1976 deaths
American male cross-country skiers
Olympic cross-country skiers of the United States
Cross-country skiers at the 1960 Winter Olympics
People from Kalix Municipality
Swedish emigrants to the United States